is a retired Japanese judoka.

Biography
Narazaki competed at the 1996 Summer Olympics, winning a bronze medal in the half-lightweight division.

Narazaki returned to competitive judo in 1999, winning a gold medal at the 1999 World Judo Championships. At the 2000 Summer Olympics, she became the first married Japanese judoka to compete in the Olympics, finishing with a silver medal. She retired after the 2000 Summer Olympics and began teaching at Bunkyo University in April, 2001.

See also
 List of judoka
 List of Olympic medalists in judo

References

External links
 
 
 

1972 births
Living people
Japanese female judoka
People from Yamato, Kanagawa
Sportspeople from Kanagawa Prefecture
Judoka at the 1996 Summer Olympics
Judoka at the 2000 Summer Olympics
Olympic silver medalists for Japan
Olympic bronze medalists for Japan
Olympic judoka of Japan
University of Tsukuba alumni
Olympic medalists in judo
Asian Games medalists in judo
Judoka at the 1994 Asian Games
Medalists at the 2000 Summer Olympics
Medalists at the 1996 Summer Olympics
Asian Games silver medalists for Japan
Medalists at the 1994 Asian Games
20th-century Japanese women
21st-century Japanese women